The Grammy Award for Best Instrumental Composition (including its previous names) has been awarded since 1960. The award is presented to the composer of an original piece of music (not an adaptation), first released during the eligibility year. In theory, any style of music is eligible for this category, but winning compositions are usually in the jazz or film score genres.

The Grammy is awarded to the composer(s) of the music, not to the performing artist, except if the artist is also the composer. There have been several minor changes to the name of the award:

In 1959 it was awarded as Best Musical Composition First Recorded and Released in 1958 (over 5 minutes duration)
In 1960 it was awarded as Best Musical Composition First Recorded and Released in 1959 (more than 5 minutes duration)
In 1962 it was awarded as Best Instrumental Theme or Instrumental Version of Song
From 1963 to 1964 and from 1967 to 1970 it was awarded as Best Instrumental Theme
In 1965 it was awarded as Best Instrumental Composition (other than jazz)
From 1971 to the present it has been awarded as Best Instrumental Composition

Years reflect the year in which the Grammy Awards were presented, for works released in the previous year.

Recipients

Multiple wins

References

Instrumental Composition